Cecile Paul Simon (April 12, 1881 - January 3, 1970) was a French composer who published under at least two pseudonyms and was the mother of composer Louise Marie Simon (also known as Claude Arrieu).

Simon was born in Neuilly-sur-Seine. Little is known about her education. She married Paul Simon and their daughter Louise Marie was born in 1903. Simon published under her own name and also under the pseudonyms Guy Portal and John (or Jean) Rovens. 

Simon’s compositions were published by Durdilly and Rouart.

Chamber 

Sonata (violin and piano)

Sonata No. 2 (flute or violin and piano)

Trio (violin, cello and piano)

Orchestra  

Etude Symphonique 

Poeme

Theatre 

Fleur de Peche (text by L. Payen)

L’aumone de Don Juan

La Belle au Bois Dormant

Marchand de Regrets (text by Fernand Crommelynck)

Vocal 

“L’heure Exquise” (text by Paul Verlaine) 

“Simple Tale” (medium voice and orchestra or piano; text by Jean Cocteau)

“Valses” (text by Janine Lirret pseud. Raymonde Terrail)

References 

French women composers
1881 births
1970 deaths
Pseudonyms